Günter Siebert may refer to:
 Günter Siebert (footballer) (1930–2017), German footballer
 Günter Siebert (weightlifter) (born 1931), German weightlifter